Diessen is a village in the Dutch province of North Brabant. It is located in the municipality of Hilvarenbeek.

History 
The village was first mentioned in 380 as Deusone, and relates to the Dieze River. The etymology is unclear. Diessen developed in the Early Middle Ages around the Reusel stream.

The St Willibrordus church with a choir from the early-15th century and a nave from around 1450. The tower was probably built in 1527. The church was restored between 1970 and 1773, and some of the 19th century modifications have been undone.

Diessen was home to 1,003 people in 1840. Diessen was a separate municipality until 1997, when it was merged with Hilvarenbeek.

Diessen is hypothesized to be the birthplace Deusone of the Gallic Emperor Postumus.

Gallery

References

Municipalities of the Netherlands disestablished in 1997
Populated places in North Brabant
Former municipalities of North Brabant
Hilvarenbeek